Different World, A Different World, or Different Worlds may refer to:

Books and publications
 Different Worlds, a roleplaying games magazine
 Different Worlds Publications, the company that publishes the magazine of the same name

Television and film
 A Different World, a TV sitcom on NBC
 Wonderful Losers: A Different World, a 2017 film

Music

Albums
 Different Worlds: The Definitive Vandenberg, a compilation album by Vandenberg
 Different World (Uriah Heep album), a 1991 album by Uriah Heep
 Different World (Alan Walker album), a 2018 studio album by Alan Walker

Songs
 "Different World" (Iron Maiden song), 2006
 "A Different World" (song), a 2007 country song by Bucky Covington
 "A Different World", a 2016 song by Korn from the album The Serenity of Suffering
 "Different World" (Alan Walker song), 2018
 "Different World", a 1986 song by INXS from the soundtrack to Crocodile Dundee
 "Different Worlds", the theme song from the U.S. TV series Angie performed by Maureen McGovern

See also
 Another World (disambiguation)
 Otherworld (disambiguation)